Myski (Tomazaq) is a town in Kemerovo Oblast, Russia, located at the confluence of the Mras-Su and Tom Rivers,  southeast of Kemerovo. Population:

History
It was established as the village of Mysovskaya, also called Myski and Beryozovy Mys. It was granted town status in 1956.

Administrative and municipal status
Within the framework of administrative divisions, it is, together with fourteen rural localities, incorporated as Myski Town Under Oblast Jurisdiction—an administrative unit with the status equal to that of the districts. As a municipal division, Myski Town Under Oblast Jurisdiction is incorporated as Myskovsky Urban Okrug.

References

Notes

Sources

External links
 Official website of Myski

Cities and towns in Kemerovo Oblast